Those Prison Blues is an album by blues musician Robert Pete Williams recorded by Harry Oster in Louisiana State Penitentiary in 1959 and 1960 and originally released on the Folk-Lyric label before being reissued with an altered track listing on Arhoolie in 1971.

Reception

Eugene Chadbourne's review on AllMusic stated: "Although some of these tracks are brilliant, there are more consistent collections available by this artist, as well as ones that are more generous with playing time".

Track listing
All compositions by Robert Pete Williams except where noted

Original Folk-Lyric Release
 "I'll Be Glad When I'm from Behind Iron Walls" – 5:23
 "Louise" – 4:24 
 "Blue in Me" – 4:02
 "Come Here, Baby, Tell Me What Is Wrong with You" – 1:57
 "I Got the Blues So Bad" – 3:35
 "Boogy Woman" – 3:06
 "Pardon Renied (Denied) Again" – 4:44
 "Army Blues" – 3:13
 "Blues in the Dark" –
 "Make Me a Pallet on the Floor" (Traditional)
 "Angola Special" – 4:12

Arhoolie Reissue
 "Pardon Denied Again" – 4:44
 "This Wild Old Life" <previously unreleased – 4:20
 "Texas Blues" <previously unreleased – 5:07
 "Up And Down Blues" <previously unreleased – 6:00
 "I'm Blue as a Man Can Be" [aka "I'll Be Glad When I'm From Behind Iron Walls"] – 5:23
 "Louise" – 4:24
 "Blue in Me" – 4:02
 "I Got the Blues So Bad" – 3:35
 "Come Here Baby, Tell Me What Is Wrong with You" – 1:57

Personnel

Performance
Robert Pete Williams – guitar, vocals
Hogman Maxey – 12 string guitar (on "Boogy Woman" and "Army Blues")

Production
 Chris Strachwitz, Harry Oster – producer
 Harry Oster, Richard Allen – engineer

References

Robert Pete Williams albums
1959 albums
Arhoolie Records albums